Metagkitsi is a village on the Chalkidiki peninsula in Macedonia, Greece.

References 

Populated places in Chalkidiki